The Sisters Hospitallers of the Sacred Heart of Jesus, acronym H.S.C., is an institute of consecrated life established in 1881 by the Italian priest St. Benedict Menni (1841–1914). 

It is devoted to poor sick people, especially the mentally handicapped, and elderly persons.

Bibliography
Annuario Pontificio per l'anno 2007, Libreria Editrice Vaticana, Città del Vaticano 2007. .
 Guerrino Pelliccia e Giancarlo Rocca (curr.), Dizionario degli Istituti di Perfezione (10 voll.), Edizioni paoline, Milano 1974–2003.

References

External links
 Sisters Hospitalliers

1881 establishments in Spain
Religious organizations established in 1881
Catholic orders and societies
Catholic religious institutes established in the 19th century